Gula Gula is an album by the Sámi singer Mari Boine, recorded in 1989 and released on the Iđut and Virgin labels. It provided her breakthrough, making her internationally famous; it was followed by numerous other albums. It won a Norwegian Grammy award in 1989. Boine appeared on the album as "Mari Boine Persen", her Norwegian name; on later albums she used her Sámi name only. 

The album was further released in 1991 by Atlantic (91631) and in 1993 by Real World Records (62312). An extended CD with bonus tracks was released by EmArcy/Universal (0177812) in 2000.

Approach

The album is rooted in Mari Boine's experience of being in a despised minority; the song "Oppskrift for Herrefolk" ("Recipe for a Master Race") is sung in Norwegian, unlike the rest of the songs which are in Northern Sami. It speaks directly of "discrimination and hate", and recommends ways of oppressing a minority: "Use bible and booze and bayonet"; "Use articles of law against ancient rights". 
Other songs tell of the beauty and wildness of Sápmi (Lapland). The title track asks the listener to remember "that the earth is our mother". Boine described in an interview with Norwegian American how the songs came about:

Boine sings in an adaptation of traditional Sámi style, using the "joik" voice, with a range of accompanying instruments and percussion from indigenous traditions from around the world. The instruments used include drum, guitar, electric bass clarinet, dozo n'koni, gangan, udu, darbuka, tambourine, seed rattles, cymbal, clarinet, piano, frame drum, saz, drone drum, hammered dulcimer, bouzouki, overtone flute, bells, bass, quena, charango and antara.

Track listing

All tracks are composed and performed by Mari Boine. All are in the Northern Sámi language, except as indicated.

 "Gula Gula" (Hør Stammødrenes Stemme/Hear the Voices of the Foremothers) - 03:40
 "Vilges Suola" (Hvite Tyv/White Thief) - 04:15
 "Balu Badjel Go Vuoittán" (Når Jeg Vinner Over Angsten/When I Win Against Fear) - 04:00
 "Du Lahka" (Near You) - 05:14
 "It Šat Duolmma Mu" (You Don't Step on Me No More) - 03:48 
 "Eadnán Bákti" (Klippen – til Kvinnen/To Woman) - 03:17
 "Oppskrift for Herrefolk" (Recipe for a Master Race) - 03:54 (in Norwegian)
 "Duinne" (Til Deg/To You) - 06:27

Bonus tracks on 2000 CD:

 "Oarbbis Leat" (Fremmed Fugl) - 05:31
 "Čuovgi Liekkas" (Radiant Warmth) - 04:11
 "Gula Gula" Chilluminati mix - 04:48

Personnel

 Mari Boine - vocals, drum, guitar
 Eivind Aarset - guitar
 Christer Bo Bothen - electric bass clarinet, dozo n'koni, ganga
 Unni Shael Damslora - claypot (udu), darbuka, tambourine, seed rattles, cymbal
 Tellef Kvifte - clarinet, piano
 Roger Ludvigsen - guitar, breath, piano, frame drum, saz
 Ale Möller - drone drum, hammered dulcimer, bouzouki, overtone flute
 Gjermund Silseth - bells, bass, piano
 Leiv Solberg - bass
 Carlos Zamata Quipse - quena, breath, charango, antara

Reception and legacy

The AllMusic review awarded the album 5 stars.

In 2003, the musicologist Olle Edström called the album's lyrics "still highly political", but noted that the music had changed, with folk musicians from Sweden, Peru and elsewhere, making the album "World music", or more precisely in Edström's characterisation "a mixture of rock with quasi-West-African rhythms, with short phrases sung in a kind of Sami/Native North-American technique and with rather few harmonies or drone-like harmonies". In his view, the musical forms are simple, with "the musicians playing 'ethnic' instruments such as the West African drums, mbira, Greek bouzouki, etc". He describes her singing style as "a special 'ethnic' voice technique of her own" that "reminds Samish listeners in part of traditional jojk technique and convinces European listeners that it is".

Silje F. Erdal, for Norway's FolkMusikk organisation, described the album as Boine's breakthrough, especially when Peter Gabriel re-released it on his Real World label. She noted that it was commissioned for the Beaivváš Sámi Našunálateáhter theatre, and that the title song "Gula Gula", with its call to "hear the voices of the tribal mothers", has an "obvious feminist message". It won a Norwegian Grammy award (Spellemanprisen) in 1989.

Merlyn Driver, writing for Songlines thirty years after the album's release, comments that "If you’ve heard of just one Sámi musician, it's probably Mari Boine", and that her voice "a bewitching combination of melancholy, vulnerability and strength, has never sounded more impressive than on Gula Gula".

The title song formed the first (instrumental) track of the Norwegian jazz musician Jan Garbarek's 1990 album I Took Up the Runes. The contemporary reviewer Jim Aikin called the track "especially memorable".

References

External links
  – lyrics of all tracks in English, Northern Sámi, and Norwegian

1989 albums
World music albums by Norwegian artists